Óscar Ngomo Mifumu (born 28 July 1990) is an Equatoguinean professional basketball player who plays as a power forward for CB Salou and the Equatorial Guinea national team. He also holds Spanish citizenship.

Early life
Ngomo was born in Madrid (Spain). His family is from Kié-Ntem to Fang parents. Shortly after, his family moved to Madrid, Spain and they settled permanently in Tarragona when he was 9.

Club career
Ngomo has developed almost his entire club career in Catalonia, but he has also been part of the Malabo Kings squad in Equatorial Guinea..

International career
Ngomo has joined the Equatorial Guinea men's national basketball team in January 2020.

References

External links

1990 births
Living people
Power forwards (basketball)
Equatoguinean men's basketball players
People from Kié-Ntem
Equatoguinean emigrants to Spain
Naturalised citizens of Spain
Spanish men's basketball players
Basketball players from Madrid
CB Tarragona players